Pogona minor is a species of agamid lizard from a group commonly known as bearded dragons, and is found on the southwest coast and interior of  Western Australia. This taxonomic name includes the widespread type known as western bearded dragon, Pogona minor minor which is widespread across West Australia between the Pilbara and the south coast, and the subspecies, Pogona minor minima is confined to the Wallabi Group of islands. There is another subspecies, Pogona minor mitchelli which lives in tropical woodlands of the Kimberley area of West Australia.

Description
Pogona minor minor lizards are large, 38 cm in length (15 cm from snout to vent), P. m. minima is slightly smaller, at 11cm snout to vent, and P. m. mitchelli has a snout to vent length of 16cm.  All bearded dragons have a chameleon-like colour, either blending into their environments or presenting brighter displays during interaction with others. They are similar in appearance to Pogona nullarbor and Caimanops amphiboluroides (mulga dragon), but are distinguished by smaller heads, and the arrangement of spines on their undersides and necks. The western bearded dragon is widespread in Southwest Australia and central deserts; the range includes semiarid regions such as woodland or heathland, and arid desert or coastal dunes. This subspecies also occurs on Dirk Hartog Island.
Pogona minor minima is found on West, North, and East Wallabi Islands, Houtman Abrolhos.

These dragons display a behavior common to other Pogona species, they will wave one of their fore legs to trigger a response from a potential rival or mate. Another typical behavior is head-bobbing amongst males, perhaps related to dominance within their social order. They are often seen basking on fence posts.

They usually lay egg clutches of 5–9, though clutches of up to 15 have been recorded.

Due to their small size, it is likely that they are insectivorous rather than herbivorous like most other bearded dragon species.

See also
Bearded dragon
List of reptiles of Western Australia

References

Sidney's Overview of Bearded Dragon Species

Further reading
Paper: Ecology of the western bearded dragon ...
 Institute for Genomic Research (TIGR): Taxonomy

External links

Reptiles of Western Australia
Pogona
Taxa named by Richard Sternfeld
Reptiles described in 1919
Agamid lizards of Australia